Dirty Rice is the sixth full-length studio album by California ska punk band Mad Caddies, released on May 13, 2014. This was the band's first full-length album in over seven years, following 2007's Keep It Going. After a few years of writing and pre-production, the band had 25 songs completed. They met with Fat Mike in September, 2013 to help sort through the collection, resulting in a list narrowed down to the 12 songs appearing on the album.

Critical reception

At Alternative Press, Jeff Rosenstock rated the album four stars out of five, remarking that "Dirty Rice finds the band at their best".

Track listing

Brand New Scar
Love Myself
Down and Out
Shoot Out the Lights
Dangerous
Bring It Down
Shot In the Dark
Little Town
Airplane
Callie’s Song
Back To the Bed
Drinking the Night Away

Personnel
Band
 Chuck Robertson - Vocals, Guitar
 Sascha Lazor - Guitar, Banjo
 Graham Palmer - Bass, Vocals
 Keith Douglas - Trumpet, Vocals
 Eduardo Hernandez - Trombone
 Dustin Lanker - Piano, Organ
 Todd Rosenberg - Drums

Artwork
 Sergie Loobkoff - Cover design
 Graham Palmer - Cover photo

References

External links
Dirty Rice at Fat Wreck Chords

2014 albums
Mad Caddies albums
Fat Wreck Chords albums